Word and Utopia (Palavra e Utopia) is a 2000 Portuguese film directed by Manoel de Oliveira. It was screened in competition at the 2000 Venice Film Festival.

Cast
 Lima Duarte as Padre António Vieira (Old)  
 Luís Miguel Cintra as Padre António Vieira (Middle Years)  
 Ricardo Trêpa as Padre António Vieira (Young)  
 Miguel Guilherme as Padre Jose Soares  
 Leonor Silveira as Queen Christina

Awards
Golden Globes (Portugal)
Best Director

Venice Film Festival
Filmcritica "Bastone Bianco" Award

See also

Cinema of Portugal

References

External links
 

2000 drama films
2000 films
Films directed by Manoel de Oliveira
Portuguese drama films
2000s Portuguese-language films